Antoni Komendo-Borowski (6 June 1912 – 12 May 1984) was a Polish footballer. He played in one match for the Poland national football team in 1935.

References

External links
 

1912 births
1984 deaths
Polish footballers
Poland international footballers
Place of birth missing
Association footballers not categorized by position